Bitten is a fantasy novel by Canadian writer Kelley Armstrong, published in 2001. It is the first book in the Women of the Otherworld series, and her first novel.

Plot introduction
Elena Michaels is the only known female werewolf, but she grows tired of spending her life pursuing rogue werewolves and trying to control her temper and violence. She decides to leave her Pack and live in Toronto as a human, but the Pack leader calls in a favor, which leads Elena to try to help quell an uprising.

Plot summary

The main character of Bitten is Elena Michaels, a woman who is the only known female werewolf in the world. She lives in Toronto, Ontario, Canada, and writes for a popular newspaper. She struggles to deal with her other-ness and to assimilate to the human world. She also contends with her terrible childhood and with the man who bit her and turned her into a werewolf.

Elena has settled into a somewhat normal existence, living with her architect boyfriend and ignoring her wolf side as much as possible. However, she learns that her Pack (the governing body of werewolves) is in trouble and comes to their aid, flying to Stonehaven, the country estate of the pack Alpha. It is in Bear Valley, a fictional city in up-state New York. When Elena arrives, she is greeted by her ex-lover, Clayton Danvers, who bit her and made her a werewolf (without her consent). Clayton is also the bodyguard and foster-son to Jeremy Danvers, the pack Alpha (leader). Elena learns that a local woman was found murdered on Stonehaven's land,  savaged by what authorities thought to be a dog. However, the Pack has determined that she was murdered by a Mutt, a rogue werewolf. They find out he is a recently escaped killer who was recently turned into a werewolf. Clay and Elena chase him into a rave and after several of the partygoers are killed, the wolf is hit by an SUV.

Soon, the rest of the Pack arrives to help with the problem: Antonio Sorrentino, his son Nicholas Sorrentino, Logan Jonsen, and Peter Myers. The werewolf Pack are the self-appointed governing body of the werewolf world. If they feel any non-Pack wolves (called "Mutts") become noticeable to humans, they kill them. In an ambush Peter is killed and Jeremy, the Alpha, is seriously wounded. Finally, the pack figures out that the "mutts", tired of being governed by the Pack, are trying to free themselves from their rule. To do this, one mutt, Daniel, has started turning human killers and other escaped convicts into werewolves to fight the pack.

Characters

Pack Werewolves
 Antonio Sorrentino – Hereditary werewolf and father of Nick. Once the Pack's top fighter, still strong. The best friend of the Alpha Wolf (Jeremy).
 Clayton (Clay) Danvers – Bitten as a child, is seen as more wolf than human. He is Jeremy's foster-son-turned bodyguard and the werewolf who bit Elena. He is also Elena's ex-lover and is still in love with her. Bitten as a child, the story of which is told in Kelley's first online novella, Savage.
 Elena Michaels – Journalist and the only known female werewolf. Bitten by then-lover, Clayton. Her parents died in a car crash while she was young, which sent her into many abusive foster families. Determined to leave that life behind, she focused on school and went to college, where she met Clayton. Used to live with the pack but attempted to leave at one point. Lives in Toronto with her boyfriend Philip.
 Jeremy Danvers – Alpha werewolf and leader of the Pack. Possesses psychic abilities used to contact other Pack members. A hereditary werewolf, he has the unusual (for a werewolf) hobby of marksmanship.
 Nicholas (Nick) Sorrentino – Hereditary werewolf, son of Antonio, and best friend of Clayton.
 Logan Jonsen – Hereditary werewolf, close friend, almost like a brother, to Elena. On the outskirts of the pack, lives in Albany, NY, and is a lawyer who practices in the state of New York and Los Angeles, California. Is killed by Thomas LeBlanc
 Peter (Pete) Myers – Hereditary werewolf, good friend of Elena. Also on the outskirts of the Pack. Works as a sound engineer for top bands on tour. He once accidentally murdered two women, was rescued by Jeremy. Killed by Mutt Daniel Santos.

Mutts 
 Daniel Santos – Hereditary werewolf and a former member of the Pack. He left the pack after Clayton killed Stephen Santos, his brother. He loathes Clayton and believes Elena should be "his". A man-killer considered dangerous and possibly insane by the pack, he was betrayed and killed by Thomas LeBlanc. 
 Jimmy Koenig – Hereditary werewolf and the nephew of Billy Koenig, he is an ex-drug addict/alcoholic and man-killer; killed by Clayton.
 Karl Marsten – Hereditary werewolf and wealthy professional thief who is seeking territory to settle in. Considered the second most dangerous Mutt by the pack but also sociable.
 Scott Brandon – Bitten werewolf, he is a serial killer turned by Karl Marsten; shot and killed by a police officer and then hit by an oncoming truck.
 Thomas LeBlanc – Bitten werewolf, also a serial killer turned by Daniel. Targets women and killed by Elena.
 Victor Olson – Bitten werewolf and pedophile, turned by Zachary Cain and killed by Elena.
 Zachary Cain – Hereditary werewolf, he is huge and an excellent fighter, but not very bright. After being interrogated by Jeremy and Clayton, he is killed by Clayton.

Humans 
 Philip Mcadam – Elena's live-in boyfriend. Lives in Toronto, where he works as an architect.
 Anne – Mother of Philip (Elena's boyfriend), Judith and Diane.
 Larry – Father of Philip, Judith and Diane, husband of Anne.
 Diane – Phillip's sister.
 Ken – Diane's husband.
 Judith – Phillip's older sister who lives in the UK.

Concept and creation
Armstrong says Bitten was inspired by an X-Files episode on werewolves. She had the idea to portray werewolves as other than "bloodthirsty, ravening beasts" and quickly wrote a short story about a young woman who becomes a werewolf to present to her writing group. Eventually, Armstrong fleshed out the short story into a novel that became Bitten.

Werewolf mythology
In the Women of the Otherworld series, unlike many modern horror fiction stories, werewolves transform into full wolves in a painful transmogrification, while maintaining their hair colour and body mass, making them extremely large wolves. Although transformations have to occur regularly, Armstrong's werewolves are not affected by phases of the moon, can shape-shift at will and can learn to transform a single part of their body. Werewolves can be killed by anything that can kill a human and have no extra sensitivity to silver. They age slower than humans. For example, Antonio and his son Nick, despite an age gap of 17 years, pass themselves off as brothers in human company. In fact, Pack sons are raised referring to their fathers as 'uncle' while amidst humans, in order to avoid questions.

While in human form, werewolves have wolf-like characteristics, better hearing, a keener sense of smell and a wolf's instinctive reactions, while in wolf form they maintain their intellect but cannot talk and are more driven by instinct. In both forms, they have greater strength and reflexes than a normal human or wolf and heal significantly faster. Hereditary werewolves acquire these enhanced abilities gradually, following puberty, and have their first change in their late teens or early 20s. Non-hereditary werewolves start changing shortly after they are bitten, and not all survive the process; the bitten Mutts took around a month to recover. In the case of Clay, he could transform and had the enhanced abilities from when he was bitten at around age five.

Awards and nominations
 Nominated Best First Novel by the International Horror Guild

Screen adaptations
For a while, there was discussion of making a movie adaptation of this novel. Angelina Jolie was approached to play the central role of Elena. A script is still floating around for it.

On 23 August 2012, Space announced that a full-season TV adaptation of Bitten would commence production in spring 2013. The 13-part series was scheduled to premiere in fall 2013 but was pushed back and premiered in January 2014. On 9 March 2013, it was announced that Laura Vandervoort would be cast as Elena Michaels.

On August 12, 2014, the full first season was released in the United States of America on Blu-ray and DVD.

Release details
First released in the U. S. by Viking Press in September 2001, in hardcover.
Released in trade paperback in January 2003 by Plume books.
Released in mass market paperback in August 2004 by Plume books.

References

External links and quotations
"Frisky... Tells a rather sweet love story, and suggests that being a wolf may be more comfortable for a strong, smart young woman than being human." – New York Times review
"[Does] the same thing for werewolves that Anne Rice did for vampires in her Interview with the Vampire."- Rocky Mountain News
 Author's Official Website
 Review of "Bitten" at rpg.net
Review of "Bitten" at sfsite.com
Author's page at agent's website

Novels by Kelley Armstrong
Werewolf novels
2001 Canadian novels
Novels set in Toronto
Novels set in New York (state)
Random House books
2001 debut novels